Andrology (from , anēr, genitive , andros 'man' and , -logia) is a name for the medical specialty that deals with male health, particularly relating to the problems of the male reproductive system and urological problems that are unique to men. It is the counterpart to gynaecology, which deals with medical issues which are specific to female health, especially reproductive and urologic health.

Process
Andrology covers anomalies in the connective tissues pertaining to the genitalia, as well as changes in the volume of cells, such as in genital hypertrophy or macrogenitosomia.

From reproductive and urologic viewpoints, male-specific medical and surgical procedures include vasectomy, vasovasostomy (one of the vasectomy reversal procedures), orchidopexy and circumcision as well as intervention to deal with male genitourinary disorders such as the following:

History
Unlike gynaecology, which has a plethora of medical board certification programs worldwide, andrology has none. Andrology has only been studied as a distinct specialty since the late 1960s: the first specialist journal on the subject was the German periodical Andrologie (now called Andrologia), published from 1969 onwards. The next specialty journal covering both the basic and clinical andrology was the International Journal of Andrology, established in 1978, which became the official journal of the European Academy of Andrology in 1992. In 1980 the American Society of Andrology launched the Journal of Andrology. In 2012, these two society journals merged into one premier journal in the field, named Andrology, with the first issue published in January 2013.

See also 
 Men's health
 Reproductive health
 Urology

References

External links 
 Andrology journal
 American Society of Andrology
 European Academy of Andrology
 British Andrology Society
 International Society of Andrology
 Andrology Australia

Andrology